Ice hockey at the 2011 European Youth Olympic Winter Festival was a men's junior ice hockey tournament played during the Liberec 2011 edition of the European Youth Olympic Festival (EYOF). It was held at the Tipsport Arena in Liberec, Czech Republic from 14 to 18 February 2011.

Results

Medal table

Medalists

Group stage

Group A

Group B

Knockout stage

5th place match

3rd place match

Final

2011
Ice hockey
Olympic
Olympic
2011